Iryna Romoldanova (born 29 May 1994 in Kyiv) is a Ukrainian taekwondo practitioner.

Romoldanova won the silver medal in the women's Finweight class at the 2015 World Taekwondo Championships.

In 2017, Romoldanova won the gold medal in the women's Finweight class at the Summer Universiade in Taipei.

References

External links
 ftu.com.ua
 

1994 births
Living people
Sportspeople from Kyiv
Ukrainian female taekwondo practitioners
Taekwondo practitioners at the 2010 Summer Youth Olympics
Taekwondo practitioners at the 2015 European Games
European Games competitors for Ukraine
Universiade medalists in taekwondo
Universiade gold medalists for Ukraine
World Taekwondo Championships medalists
Medalists at the 2017 Summer Universiade
Medalists at the 2019 Summer Universiade
European Taekwondo Championships medalists
21st-century Ukrainian women